Huarache (sometimes spelled guarache) is a popular Mexican dish consisting of masa dough with smashed pinto beans placed in the center before it is given an oblong shape, fried, topped with green or red salsa, onions, potato, cilantro and any manner of protein such as ground beef or tongue, then finished with queso fresco.  Huaraches are also often paired with fried cactus leaves, or nopales. This dish is most popular in its hometown of Mexico City and is also sold in cities with Mexican-American populations such as Los Angeles, San Diego, Chicago, Minneapolis/St Paul, New York, San Francisco, San Antonio, Dallas/Fort Worth, Houston, and Kansas City, but have yet to become widely available across the entire United States. Still, huaraches and other Mexican dishes have increased their presence in the Midwest due to increasing numbers of Latinos in rural America.

The name "Huarache" is derived from the shape of the masa, similar to the popular sandals of the same name. The word Huarache is originally from Purépecha and the Nahuatl word for huarache is kwarachi. Huaraches are similar to sopes and tlacoyos but differ in shape. The original huarache does not resemble a pambazo or a memela. Neither can it be classified as a tlacoyo. The main characteristic of the huarache is its elongated shape, which differentiates it from other Mexican snacks, which do not have holes in the upper part.

Origin
Huaraches originated in Mexico City in about the early 1930s. Their origin was at a stall along La Viga navigation channel, where Mrs. Carmen Gomez Medina prepared tlacoyos. When the navigation channel was covered to make the "Calzada de la Viga", Mrs. Gomez moved to another place and after 1957, when the Mercado de Jamaica was founded, she moved there, and then to a little place at Torno street. Because Mrs. Gomez's new invention was shaped differently than a sope or a tlacoyo, people started to call it "huarache".

See also
 List of Mexican dishes

References

Maize dishes
Mexican cuisine
Tortilla-based dishes